The ABC of Love is a 1967 Brazilian and Argentine drama film directed by Eduardo Coutinho and Rodolfo Kuhn and starred by Jorge Rivera López and Bárbara Mujica.

Plot
The films involves a suicide pact and marriage.

Release 
The film premiered in June 1967 at the 17th Berlin International Film Festival and was nominated for a Golden Bear Award. It premiered on 7 September 1967 in Argentina. Released in Brazil it was also released in Chile.

Cast 
 Jorge Rivera López
 Vera Vianna
 Reginaldo Faria
 Susana Rinaldi
 Federico Luppi
 Joffre Soares
 Héctor Pellegrini
 Isabel Ribeiro
 Mário Petráglia
 María Luisa Robledo
 Corrado Corradi
 Marta Gam
 Cláudio MacDowell
 Gloria Pratt
 Adriana Aizemberg

References

External links
 

1967 films
Brazilian drama films
Portuguese-language films
1960s Spanish-language films
1967 drama films
Films directed by Rodolfo Kuhn
Argentine drama films
Chilean drama films
1960s Argentine films